The 2018 Nürnberger Versicherungscup was a professional tennis tournament played on clay courts. It was the 6th edition of the tournament, and part of the 2018 WTA Tour. It took place in Nuremberg, Germany, between 21 and 26 May 2018.

Points and prize money

Prize money

Singles main draw entrants

Seeds

 Rankings are as of May 14, 2018.

Other entrants
The following players received wildcards into the singles main draw:
  Katharina Hobgarski
  Andrea Petkovic
  Sloane Stephens

The following players using a protected ranking into the singles main draw:
  Zheng Saisai

The following players received entry from the qualifying draw:
  Kristína Kučová
  Mandy Minella 
  Nadia Podoroska
  Dejana Radanović
  Fanny Stollár
  Anna Zaja

Withdrawals 
Before the tournament
  Ana Bogdan → replaced by  Verónica Cepede Royg
  Polona Hercog → replaced by  Christina McHale

Retirements 
  Irina-Camelia Begu
  Sorana Cîrstea

Doubles main draw entrants

Seeds 

 1 Rankings as of May 14, 2018.

Other entrants 
The following pairs received wildcards into the doubles main draw:
  Katharina Gerlach /  Lena Rüffer
  Jule Niemeier /  Lara Schmidt

Champions

Singles

  Johanna Larsson def.  Alison Riske, 7–6(7–4), 6–4

Doubles

  Demi Schuurs /  Katarina Srebotnik def.  Kirsten Flipkens /  Johanna Larsson, 3–6, 6–3, [10–7]

References

External links 
 Official website  

2018 WTA Tour
2018
2018 in German tennis
Nürnberger Versicherungscup